The All-Ireland Senior Ladies' Football Championship is the premier inter-county competition in the game of ladies' Gaelic football in Ireland. The series of games are organised by the Ladies' Gaelic Football Association and are played during the summer months, with the All-Ireland Final being played at Croke Park. The qualifiers were introduced in 2008.

The winning team is presented with the Brendan Martin Cup. The cup is named after Brendan Martin, a native of Tullamore, County Offaly, who organised Ladies' Gaelic football games in the early 1970s and became one of the first treasurers of the newly founded Ladies' Gaelic Football Association.

Finals

Ladies' football titles by county

References

 
 
Senior Ladies' Football Championship